This article contains records and statistics for the Japanese professional football club, Kashiwa Reysol.

J.League

Domestic cup competitions

Top scorers by season

References

Kashiwa Reysol
Kashiwa Reysol